The fictional X-Men created by Marvel Comics have appeared in multiple forms of media besides comics, including on television numerous times, in both live action and animated television programs.

Animated

The Marvel Super Heroes (1966)
The X-Men made their first ever animated appearance on The Marvel Super Heroes TV series in 1966 with Professor X commanding the original X-Men line-up of the Cyclops, the Beast, Marvel Girl, the Angel, and Iceman. The X-Men appeared in the Sub-Mariner episode "Dr. Doom's Day / The Doomed Allegiance / Tug of Death". Though the episode was adapted from Fantastic Four No. 6 (1962) and Fantastic Four Annual No. 3 (1965), Grantray-Lawrence Animation did not have the rights to the Fantastic Four (their series was produced by Hanna-Barbera), and so instead substituted the X-Men. The X-Men are never referred to in this episode as the X-Men but rather as the Allies for Peace. The characters kept their original looks and individual names from the comics.

Spider-Man and His Amazing Friends (1981–1983)
The X-Men guest-starred in several episodes of Spider-Man and His Amazing Friends, which included Iceman, along with Spider-Man and Firestar, as the main characters, starting with a flashback in "The Origin of Iceman". Appearing in this particular episode are Professor X and the five original X-Men: Iceman, the Angel, the Beast, Marvel Girl, and Cyclops. For the continuity of the show, Firestar was also a former member of the X-Men. X-Men member Sunfire would also pop up on his own in a later episode teaming up with the Amazing Friends, as well as representing a romantic interest for Firestar.

The X-Men's next appearance was in the episode "A Firestar is Born", which included appearances from Professor X, Storm, the Angel, Cyclops, Wolverine, and the Juggernaut and cameos by Magneto and a Sentinel.

The X-Men would return the following season in the episode titled "The X-Men Adventure". Making appearances this time were: Professor X, Cyclops, Sprite, Storm, Nightcrawler, Colossus, and Thunderbird. This episode was meant to be a pilot for an X-Men cartoon that was slated to feature the X-Men characters, plus Lady Lightning (an animated version of Carol Danvers / Ms. Marvel) and Videoman as members. The series was never produced.

Pryde of the X-Men (1989)
In 1989, Marvel Productions produced a half-hour pilot X-Men episode titled X-Men: Pryde of the X-Men. It related the story of Kitty Pryde's first adventure with the team of mutants which included Professor X, Cyclops, Storm, Wolverine, Colossus, Nightcrawler, and Dazzler as they fought against Magneto, the White Queen, the Juggernaut, the Blob, Pyro, and the Toad. The series was never picked up but the single episode aired infrequently in syndication during the Marvel Action Universe series and was released on video in 1990.

In 1991, a six-player arcade game and a four-player version were based upon the pilot starring Cyclops, Colossus, Wolverine, Storm, Nightcrawler, and Dazzler as the playable characters. Kitty Pryde and Professor X also appear.

X-Men (1992–1997)
In 1992, the Fox network launched an X-Men animated series with the roster of Cyclops, Wolverine, Rogue, Storm, Beast, Gambit, Jubilee, Jean Grey, and Professor X with secondary background player Morph making occasional appearances. The two-part pilot episode, "Night of the Sentinels" began a five-season series. It was an extraordinary success and helped to widen the X-Men's popularity. The five seasons ended in 1997. It returned to Fox's line-up for several months after the first movie was released in 2000.

Spider-Man (1995–1997)
The X-Men starred on Spider-Man in episodes "The Mutant Agenda" and "Mutants Revenge", when Spider-Man seeks Professor X's help with his growing mutation disease. Storm would later guest-star in the Secret Wars arc.

Fantastic Four
Cyclops, Jean Grey, Gambit, Wolverine, Storm, and the Juggernaut, along with the Scarlet Spider, made cameos in the Fantastic Four series, in the episode "Nightmare in Green", as the Human Torch flies overhead.

X-Men: Evolution (2000–2003)
In 2000, The WB launched the X-Men: Evolution television series, which portrayed the X-Men as teenagers attending a regular public high school in addition to the Xavier Institute. The series ended in 2003 after its fourth season. The show focused on Cyclops, Jean Grey, Spyke (Storm's nephew), Storm, Wolverine, Rogue, Beast, Shadowcat and Nightcrawler, in addition to introducing the character Laura Kinney / X-23, who has since become a recurring character in the comics.

Spider-Man: The New Animated Series (2003)
The X-Men and mutant-kind are mentioned in an episode of the short-lived CGI series Spider-Man: The New Animated Series called "The Party". Peter Parker is quoted as saying, "I bet the X-Men get to go to parties". Soon after, he is ambushed by a group of cops, one of them calling him a "mutant freak".

X-Men: Darktide (2006)
In 2006, Minimates released a short animated brickfilm called X-Men: Darktide on DVD with a box set of figures. The story involved the X-Men battling the Brotherhood at an oil rig. The X-Men team consists of Cyclops, Jean Grey, Archangel, Wolverine, the Beast, Xavier and Storm. The Brotherhood team is Mystique, Magneto and the Juggernaut.

Wolverine and the X-Men (2009)
In 2008, Marvel Studios released a new X-Men animated show that featured Wolverine titled Wolverine and the X-Men. This series used a mesh of 2D/3D animation for characters and backgrounds. Avi Arad, CEO of Marvel Studios, stated "X-Men is one of Marvel's crown jewels and it makes sense to focus on the popular Wolverine character for our second animation project." The series debuted in the United States on January 23, 2009 and in the U.K. in February. It also aired in Latin America and Canada. The team consisted of Wolverine, Emma Frost, Cyclops, the Beast, Storm, Shadowcat, Iceman, Rogue, Nightcrawler, the Angel, Jean Grey and Professor X. The show was cancelled just after one season due to financing issues.

The Super Hero Squad Show (2009)
The X-Men appeared on Cartoon Network's The Super Hero Squad Show.

Marvel Animation: X-Men (2011)
As part of a four-series collaboration between the Japanese Madhouse animation house and Marvel, the X-Men starred in a 12 episode anime series that premiered in Japan on Animax and in the United States on G4 in 2011. The series deals with the X-Men coming to Japan to investigate the disappearance of Armor. The antagonists are reported to be the U-Men.

Marvel Animation: Wolverine (2011)
As part of the same four-series collaboration as described above, several characters from the X-Men franchise, including Wolverine and Cyclops, are featured in a 12 episode anime series aired in Japan on Animax and in the United States on G4.

X-Men '97 (2023)
On November 12, 2021, Marvel announced a revival of the 1992–1997 animated series titled X-Men '97, set to be released on Disney+ in 2023 and will be produced by Marvel Studios. Beau DeMayo will serve as the head writer and executive producer for the upcoming series with several cast members from the original animated series are set to reprise their roles and will be joined by new cast. Original animated series director Larry Houston, and its showrunners and producers Eric and Julia Lewald are announced as the consultants for the upcoming series.

Live action

Generation X (1996) 

A television pilot produced by Marvel Entertainment after the comic of the same name. It was later aired as a TV film, and featured the characters of Jubilee, Emma Frost, Banshee, M and others.

Mutant X (2001–2004) 

A syndicated show produced under the supervision of Avi Arad and Marvel, but without the license of any mutant or Marvel characters. The show was cancelled in 2004.

Legion (2017–2019)

The show focuses on David Haller, who is diagnosed as schizophrenic. Following an encounter with another patient, he is confronted with the possibility that the voices he hears and the visions he sees might be real.

In October 2015, FX had ordered a pilot titled Legion, with Noah Hawley attached as the showrunner. It was picked up by FX in early 2017 for an eight episodes run. Starring Dan Stevens as Haller, Rachel Keller, Jean Smart, Jemaine Clement, Bill Irwin, Jeremie Harris, and Aubrey Plaza as the Shadow King, the first season aired from February to March 2017. It returned for a second season in 2018.

The Gifted (2017–2019)

The show focuses on a suburban couple whose lives are changed by the discovery that their children possess mutant powers. Forced to go on the run from the government, the family joins up with an underground network of mutants for survival. The show stars Stephen Moyer, Amy Acker, Sean Teale, Natalie Alyn Lind, Percy Hynes White, Jamie Chung as Blink, Coby Bell, Emma Dumont as Polaris, Blair Redford as Thunderbird, and Skyler Samuels as the Stepford Cuckoos. It premiered on October 2, 2017 on Fox.

Characters
The X-Men team roster varies from show to show, though multiple characters are frequently featured.

Animated

Reception

Ratings

Critical response

See also
 X-Men (film series)
 List of television series based on Marvel Comics
 Marvel Television
 Marvel Animation

References